Dovyalis caffra (Warb.), Aberia caffra (Harv. & Sond.) the Umkokola, Kei apple, Kayaba, Kai apple, or Kau apple, is a small to medium-sized tree, native to southern Africa. Its distribution extends from the Kei River in the south, from which the common name derives, northwards along the eastern side of the continent to Tanzania. The ripe fruits are tasty, reminiscent of a small apple.

It is a usually found in dry types of woodland when it grows to 6 m tall. In moister types of open woodland it reaches its greatest size of about 8–9 metres. A tree, with sharp, 3–6 cm long stem spines in the leaf axils, and large sturdy thorns. Buds at the base of the spine produce clusters of alternately arranged simple ovate leaves 3–6 cm long.

The flowers are inconspicuous, solitary or clustered, with no petals. It is dioecious, with male and female flowers on separate plants, though some female plants are parthenogenetic.

The fruit is an edible bright yellow or orange globose berry 2.5–4 cm diameter, with the skin and flesh of a uniform colour and containing several small seeds. Production is often copious, weighing down the branches during the summer. They are juicy, tasty and very acidic.

Cultivation and uses
A traditional food plant in the areas it occurs, this little-known fruit has potential to improve nutrition, boost food security, foster rural development and support sustainable landcare.

Kei-apples are often eaten fresh or sprinkled with sugar to complement their natural acidity. Aside from being eaten fresh, the fruit can be made into jam, used in desserts, or pickled (their natural acidity means vinegar is not needed). In Kenya, it is mostly used for live fences and hedges.

Although it is native to southern Africa, it has also been introduced to the Mediterranean, California, Florida, and other regions with subtropical and warm temperate climates. In these places it is most often grown as an ornamental plant, being popular as an impenetrable hedge. It is salt and drought-tolerant, so useful for coastal landscaping in dry regions.

Although a subtropical species, the Kei apple is able to survive temperatures as low as −6 °C. Gardeners who want fruit require a female plant; a fertile female plant and a fertile male plant is ideal. Kei apples are propagated by seed. Plants will bear about four years later.

Ecology 
The species is invasive in New Caledonia.

References 

Fruits originating in Africa
caffra
Flora of Southern Africa
Flora of Tanzania
Flora of South Africa
Flora of Mozambique
Crops originating from South Africa
Garden plants of Africa
Drought-tolerant trees
Ornamental trees